Frederick Van Ness Bradley (April 12, 1898 – May 24, 1947) was an American politician who served as the U.S. representative for Michigan's 11th congressional district from 1939 until his death in 1947. He was a member of the Republican Party.

Early life and career
Bradley was born in Chicago and moved to Rogers City, Michigan, in 1910 where he attended the public schools and graduated from Rogers City High School. He attended Montclair Academy in Montclair, New Jersey and in 1918 joined the United States Army for World War I. Bradley served in the Student Army Training Corps at Plattsburgh Barracks, New York.

He graduated from Cornell University in 1921. His father was president of the Michigan Limestone and Chemical Company, and Bradley worked for the company as a salesman in Buffalo, New York from 1921 to 1923. He was a purchasing agent with Bradley Transportation Company in Rogers City, Michigan from 1924 to 1938.

Congress
In 1938, Bradley was the successful Republican nominee to represent Michigan's 11th congressional district, defeating incumbent Democrat John Luecke. He was reelected four times and served from January 3, 1939 until his death. He was chairman of the Committee on Merchant Marine and Fisheries in the 80th Congress. With his longtime interest in Great Lakes shipping, Bradley was the legislative sponsor behind the construction of the Round Island Passage Light.

Bradley died in New London, Connecticut on May 24, 1947 while there to attend a meeting of the United States Coast Guard Academy board of visitors. He was interred at Rogers City Memorial Park.

Family
In 1922, Bradley married Marcia Marie Hillidge of Front Royal, Virginia. They were the parents of a son, Carl, who died in 1938 at the age of two.

See also
 List of United States Congress members who died in office (1900–1949)

References

The Political Graveyard

1898 births
1947 deaths
Cornell University alumni
Republican Party members of the United States House of Representatives from Michigan
20th-century American politicians